The Springfield Model 1861 was a Minié-type rifled musket used by the United States Army and Marine Corps during the American Civil War. Commonly referred to as the "Springfield" (after its original place of production, Springfield, Massachusetts). It was the most widely used Union Army shoulder weapon during the Civil War, favored for its range, accuracy, and reliability.

Overview
The Model 1861 had a general effective range of  but could reliably hit man-sized targets out to  when used by marksmen, and used percussion caps which were much more reliable and weather resistant to fire (rather than the flintlocks of the 18th century; the last U.S. flintlock musket was the Springfield Model 1840).

The most notable difference between the Model 1861 and the earlier Springfield Model 1855 was the elimination of the Maynard tape primer for the Model 1861 (the Maynard primer, a self-feeding primer system, was unreliable in damp conditions, and the priming mechanism was expensive and time-consuming to produce). Further, unlike the Model 1855, the Model 1861 was never produced in a two-banded rifle configuration.

The Model 1861 was aimed using flip-up leaf sights. While the Enfield's sights did allow finer range settings, the Model 1861 rifled musket's simple leaves were more rugged and were less expensive to produce. Realistically, though, hitting anything beyond  with either weapon was mostly a matter of luck. While the sight designs were very different, the two weapons were otherwise very similar, and had very similar effective ranges.

The Model 1861 cost around $15 each at the Springfield Armory where they were officially made. 

Overwhelmed by the demand, the armory opened its weapons patterns up to twenty independent contractors. The most notable producer of contract Model 1861 rifled muskets was Colt, who made several minor design changes in their version, the "Colt Special" rifled musket. These changes included redesigned barrel bands, a new hammer, and a redesigned bolster. Several of these changes were eventually adopted by the United States Army Ordnance Department and incorporated into its successor, the Springfield Model 1863 which was a slightly improved version of the Model 1861.

History
The Model 1861 was relatively scarce in the early years of the Civil War (many troops were still using Springfield Model 1842 smoothbore muskets and Springfield Model 1816 flintlock muskets converted to percussion cap primers due to better reliability and weather resistance, both in .69 caliber). It is unlikely that any of these were available for use in the First Battle of Bull Run. However, over time, more and more regiments began receiving Model 1861 rifled muskets, though this upgrade appeared somewhat quicker in the Eastern Theater of Operations. Over 1,000,000 Model 1861 rifled muskets were produced, with the Springfield Armory increasing its production during the war by contracting out to twenty other firms in the Union. 

The number of Model 1861 rifled muskets produced by the Springfield Armory was 265,129 between January 1, 1861 and December 31, 1863.

The Model 1861 was a step forward in U.S. small arms design, being the first rifled shoulder weapon adopted and widely issued as the primary infantry weapon (earlier U.S. martial rifles such as the Harpers Ferry Model 1803 rifle were issued to riflemen rather than the infantry as a whole and production and issuance of the Model 1855 prior to the war had been limited by comparison to the Model 1855). However, some argue that its impact on the Civil war has been overstated. While more accurate in the hands of an experienced marksman, the rifled musket's accuracy was often lost in the hands of recruits who received only limited marksmanship training (the emphasis was on rate of fire). Further, most Civil War firefights were waged at a relatively close range using massed-fire tactics, minimizing the effect of the new rifled musket's long-range accuracy. Lastly, the .58 caliber bullet, when fired, followed a high parabolic trajectory. As a result, many inexperienced soldiers who did not adjust their sights would shoot over their enemies' heads in combat. There are numerous accounts of this happening in the war's earlier battles. With this in mind, soldiers were often instructed to aim low. Due to the width of the front sight on the Model 1861 Special the only bayonet that would fit was the Collins manufactured bayonet.

With the introduction of modern brass ammunition after the war, the Model 1861 served as the starting point for several breechloaders, most of which were converted Model 1861 and Model 1863 rifled muskets, culminating in the Springfield Model 1873 and its successors which would serve through the Indian Wars and all U.S. military actions until the end of the 19th century.

Modern usage
The Model 1861 is very popular today among Civil War reenactors and collectors alike for its accuracy, reliability and historical background. Original antique Springfields are expensive, so companies such as Davide Pedersoli & C., Chiappa Firearms (Armi Sport) and Euro Arms make modern reproductions at much more affordable prices.

See also
Springfield rifle
Springfield musket

References

External links

Springfield firearms
Rifled muskets
American Civil War rifles
American Civil War weapons
Weapons of the Confederate States of America